The Moys Classification Scheme is a system of library classification for legal materials. It was designed by Betty Moys and first published in 1968. It is used primarily in law libraries in many common law jurisdictions such as Canada, Australia, New Zealand, and the United Kingdom.

Overview
The Moys system is designed to fit into a library that utilises Library of Congress Classification (LCC). The primary reason for this is that LCC had not fully developed the K class (the class for Law) at the time when the Moys system was developed. In addition, LCC is the main classification system used in academic libraries. This commonality is the rationale behind adopting the same notation style used in the LCC Class K. The subclasses and enumeration are very different in the two systems, though. As with LCC, a set of numbers follows the class letters to indicate specific subject areas (however there is notably less use of decimal points in the Moys system than in LCC).

Classes   
Note: Not all of these subclasses are mandatory, and certain classes may not be utilised in some libraries.

 K - Journals and reference books
 KA - Jurisprudence
 KB - General and comparative law
 KC - International law
 KD - Religious legal systems
 KE - Ancient and medieval law
 KF-KN - Common law
 KF - British Isles
 KG - Canada, US, West Indies
 KH - Australia, New Zealand
 KL - General
 KM - Public law
 KN - Private law
 KP - Preferred jurisdiction
 KR - Africa
 KS - Latin America
 KT - Asia and Pacific
 KV - Europe
 KW - European Community Law (alternative)
 KZ - Non-legal subjects

References

Legal research
Library cataloging and classification